The 1989 Dow Classic was a women's tennis tournament played on grass courts at the Edgbaston Priory Club in Birmingham in the United Kingdom that was part of the Category 2 tier of the 1989 WTA Tour. It was the 8th edition of the tournament and was held from 12 June until 18 June 1989. First-seeded Martina Navratilova won the singles title.

Finals

Singles

 Martina Navratilova defeated  Zina Garrison 7–6(7–5), 6–3
 It was Navratilova's 3rd singles title of the year and the 141th of her career.

Doubles

 Larisa Savchenko /  Natasha Zvereva defeated  Meredith McGrath /  Pam Shriver 7–5, 5–7, 6–0
 It was Savchenko's 3rd title of the year and the 13th of her career. It was Zvereva's 3rd title of the year and the 5th of her career.

External links
 ITF tournament edition details
 Tournament draws

Dow Chemical Classic
Birmingham Classic (tennis)
Dow Chemical Classic
Dow Chemical Classic